Mario Ruiz Armengol (known as "Mayito" or "Mister Harmony") (March 14, 1914 in Veracruz, Mexico – December 22, 2002 in Cancun, Mexico), was a Mexican pianist, composer, arranger, conductor and music teacher. He was the son of pianist and conductor Ismael Ruiz Suárez and Rosa Armengol.

Early life and career
Ruiz Armengol started to play piano at eight years old and debuted as a conductor at fifteen, along with Leopoldo Beristaín. At sixteen years old Ruiz Armengol was one of the founding members of the XEW-AM (a legendary Mexican radio broadcaster) music band.

He studied with José Rolón, Rodolfo Halffter and Joaquín Amparán, and in 1942 met Mexican composer Manuel M. Ponce with whom he started a close friendship. By 1954 he was nicknamed "Mr. Harmony" by American musicians such as Duke Ellington, Billy May and Clare Fischer.

Ruiz Armengol became very famous for his boleros. He also wrote more than 31 children's songs, 19 Cuban dances, 16 studies, 16 reflections, 32 miniatures, 5 waltzes, scherzos, minuets, sonatas, fantasies, preludes and piano works for four hands, chamber music for piano and violin, violincello, harp and flute. He was a highly reputed Mexican musician, a master of harmony and classical piano compositions.

References

 http://www.mruizarmengol.com/
 http://www.musicaunam.net/index.php?option=com_content&task=view&id=814&Itemid=132
 http://www.jornada.unam.mx/2002/12/24/06an1esp.php?origen=espectaculos.html
 http://sic.conaculta.gob.mx/ficha.php?estado_id=30&table=artista&table_id=1791

Further reading
 Fischer, Clare (1962). "Liner notes, 'Cal Tjader Plays the Contemporary Music of Mexico and Brazil'"

External links

Mexican composers
Mexican male composers
Musicians from Veracruz
Writers from Veracruz
1914 births
2002 deaths
20th-century male musicians